Maria Therese "Reese" Lansangan (born October 16, 1990) is a Filipino musician, singer-songwriter, visual artist, graphic designer, fashion designer, and published author. She is best known for her 2015 debut album Arigato, Internet!, and for being half of the indie duo Reese and Vica.

2013 Elements National Music Camp 
In 2013, she was accepted into the Philippines' highly esteemed Elements National Music Camp, where she was mentored by the likes of Ryan Cayabyab, Joey Ayala and Noel Cabangon, among others.

"Arigato, Internet!", 2015 & 2016 
On December 6, 2015, Lansangan launched her debut album called "Arigato, Internet!" at Green Sun, Makati. The album, being her way of thanking the Internet, consists of 11 songs, which were written and produced by herself, with help from some friends.

A year after, Lansangan announced that the album would have a limited edition reissue, having 7 bonus songs in collaboration with other local artists. The repackaged album was launched on February 12, 2017 at A Space, Makati.

Additional tracks:

"Of Sound Mind & Memory" (EP), 2017 
A surprise, four-tracked EP titled "Of Sound Mind & Memory" was released on April 30, 2017, described by Lansangan as "a deeply personal reflection of life and human condition".

"Playing Pretend in the Interim" (EP), 2020 
Playing Pretend in the Interim  is bold, playful, and the new Reese you never imagined. It is a five-track EP of songs completed during isolation. This is both a writing experiment and an examination of the self as a human living with and for others. She wrote these songs from different perspectives and characters (an encyclopedia salesman, a long-gone celebrity, a haunting ghost...) - seeing hyper-specific experiences with borrowed eyes. It’s a combination of research, imagination, secondhand stories, histories, and things she's heard and witnessed along the way.  This EP is a way of escaping reality for a moment, allowing room for wonder and play.

Coke Studio PH Season 1 (2017) 
In the first season of Coke Studio PH, Reese Lansangan partnered with Filipino band Franco for a collaboration. They played one song from each other's own tracks in their own rendition and one entirely new song, which both of them made.

Paramore Front Act (2018) 
On August 23, 2018, Lansangan together with her guitarist, Josh Villena, performed as an opening act for the highly revered pop punk band, Paramore, on their third visit to Manila, Philippines for their Tour Four.

Personal life 
Lansangan graduated from the Ateneo de Manila University in 2011 with a Bachelor of Fine Arts degree in information design.

Published author 
Lansangan has also co-authored a poetry book, In Case You Come Back with Marla Miniano and Jamie Catt in 2016. The book contains musings on different topics such as love, family, adventures, childhood, insecurities, and quirks, among other things. In September 2017, the three of them released a second book called, The Maps That Contain Us, a poetry and flash fiction book.

Reading advocacy 
Lansangan has acknowledged that books and reading play a big part of her life, and a big influence on her art. During a holiday in the US in 2015, she started a personal tradition she refers to as the #ArigatoInternetHunt, where she hides copies of her album in various books, for strangers to find.  She turned the tradition into an official promotion event, working with the Philippine bookstore chain Fully Booked (which she referred to as her "favorite bookstore.") in 2017.

Discography

Studio albums
 Arigato, Internet! (2015)
 Arigato, Internet! (Domo Arigato Edition) (2016)
 Time Well Spent (2021)

Extended plays
 Of Sound Mind & Memory (2017)
 Playing Pretend in the Interim (2020)

Awards & nominations

Wish Music Awards

References 

Living people
Filipino musicians
Filipino songwriters
Filipino Ukulele players
1990 births
21st-century Filipino singers
21st-century Filipino women singers
Ateneo de Manila University alumni